This is a discography of Mogwai, a Scottish post-rock band.

Albums

Studio albums

Live albums

Compilation albums

Extended plays

Singles

Remix albums

Film and television scores

Various Artists Compilation appearances

References

External links 
 Mogwai discography at Bright Light!

Mogwai
Discographies of British artists
Rock music group discographies
Alternative rock discographies